Hoorn may refer to:

One of several towns in the Netherlands:
 Hoorn, a city and municipality in North Holland.
 Hoorn, South Holland, in the municipality of Alphen aan den Rijn
 Hoorn, Groningen, in the municipality of Bellingwedde
 Hoorn, Gelderland, in the municipality of Heerde
 Hoorn, Friesland or Hoarne, in the municipality island of Terschelling
 County of Horne, sometimes spelled Hoorn, a former state of the Holy Roman Empire centred on the town of Horn, Netherlands
 Hoorn Islands, South Pacific islands named after the city of Hoorn

People with the surname
Jordanus Hoorn (1753–1833), Dutch painter
Carol Hoorn ((1930–1991), American figurative artist active in Canada

See also
 Horn (disambiguation) 
 Den Hoorn (disambiguation)
 Van Hoorn (surname)

Dutch-language surnames